Allur was a constituency of the Andhra Pradesh Legislative Assembly, India until 2008.

Overview
It was part of the Nellore Lok Sabha constituency along with other six Vidhan Sabha segments, namely, Kandukur in Prakasam district, Kavali, Atmakur, Nellore City, Nellore Rural and Udayagiri in Nellore district.

Members of Legislative Assembly

Election results

1994

See also
 List of constituencies of Andhra Pradesh Vidhan Sabha

References

Former assembly constituencies of Andhra Pradesh
Nellore district